Sabah Hakka Complex is a five-storey building complex with an event hall located at 26, Signal Hill Road, Tanjung Lipat, Likas of Kota Kinabalu, Sabah, Malaysia. The complex is built as a recognition from the Sabah government to local Hakka Chinese contribution to the economy of Sabah since their early migration with the main building structure is designed after the world-famous traditional Hakka houses in Fujian of China, the Tulao.

Features 
The complex features two main buildings of Wisma Hakka and Dewan Hakka (Hakka Hall). The hall became the centre for the inaugural Hakka International Creativity Forum 2015. In 2019, the Manchester United Malaysia fan club's fourth annual dinner was held in the hall with the invitation of United legend footballer Ronny Johnsen.

References 

Buildings and structures in Kota Kinabalu